James Yeo (October 31, 1827 – February 13, 1903) was a Canadian merchant, ship builder, ship owner, and Member of Parliament in the House of Commons of Canada for Prince Edward Island, representing Prince County beginning in 1873 when Prince Edward Island joined Canadian Confederation and serving until 1891.

Yeo was born in Port Hill, Prince Edward Island, the son of James Yeo, who was a native of Cornwall, England, and Damaris Sargent. In 1855, he married Sarah Jane Glover. He served as a member of the Legislative Assembly of Prince Edward Island representing 2nd Prince from 1872 to 1873 and was a member of the Executive Council. He was elected to the House of Commons as a Liberal member. Yeo lived most of his life in Port Hill and died in Wellington at the age of 75.

His brother John succeeded him as the member for Prince County in the House of Commons and later served in the Senate.

References

1827 births
1903 deaths
People from Prince County, Prince Edward Island
Members of the House of Commons of Canada from Prince Edward Island
Liberal Party of Canada MPs
Prince Edward Island Liberal Party MLAs
Canadian people of Cornish descent